Mike Sparken is a pseudonym for Michel Poberejsky (born 16 June 1930 in Neuilly-sur-Seine, Hauts-de-Seine; died 21 September 2012). He was a racing driver from France. He participated in one Formula One World Championship Grand Prix, at the 1955 British Grand Prix on 16 July. He finished seventh albeit nine laps down and scored no championship points.

Sparken was better known as a sportscar driver and much of his success came in events in North Africa.

Complete Formula One World Championship results 
(key)

References

Profile at grandprix.com

1930 births
2012 deaths
Sportspeople from Neuilly-sur-Seine
French racing drivers
French Formula One drivers
24 Hours of Le Mans drivers
Gordini Formula One drivers
World Sportscar Championship drivers